Weichselbaum is a town in the district of Jennersdorf in the Austrian state of Burgenland.

Geography
Cadastral communities are Krobotek, Rosendorf and Weichselbaum.

Toponymy
Weichselbaum is a common surname in Austria. The meaning of Weichselbaum in the English language is sour cherry tree.

Population

References

Cities and towns in Jennersdorf District
Slovenian communities in Burgenland